Lenny Pereira (born 1 January 1992 in Goa) is an Indian professional footballer who plays as a defender for Salgaocar in the I-League.

Career

Salgaocar
Pereira made his professional debut for Salgaocar in the I-League on 9 October 2013 against Dempo at the Duler Stadium; in which he came on as a substitute for Augustin Fernandes in the 85th minute; as Salgaocar drew the match 1–1.

Career statistics

References

External links 
 I-League Profile

1992 births
Living people
Indian footballers
Salgaocar FC players
Footballers from Goa
I-League players
Association football defenders